Robert Charles Henri Le Roux (1860–1925), known by the pen name Hugues Le Roux, was a French writer and journalist who wrote primarily about the French colonies and travel.

Early life 
He was the son of Charles Clovis Le Roux and Henriette Gourgaud. Robert was a journalist for "La Revue Politique et Littéraire," "Le Temps," "Le Figaro," "Le Journal," and "Le Matin." In addition, Robert Charles wrote books and novels.

On 11 January 1920, he became a senator until his death on 14 November 1925. Earlier in his career, he was the private secretary of Alphonse Daudet. He had written for Daudet, "La belle Nivernaise" and "Tartarin sur les Alpes"

Work 
 L'Attentat Sloughine, J. Lévy, Paris, 1885
 Médéric et Lisée, J. Lévy, Paris, 1887 
 Le Frère lai, 1888
 Chez les filles, Victor Havard, 1888
 L'Enfer parisien, Victor-Havard, Paris, 1888
 Notre patron Alphonse Daudet, 1888
 Les jeux du cirque et la vie foraine, illustrations de Jules Garnier, Plon, 1889
 Le Chemin du crime, Paris, Harvard, 1889, 265 p.
 Les Larrons, G. Charpentier, Paris, 1890
 Les Fleurs à Paris, Quantin, Paris, 1890
 Au Sahara, Mar pon & Flammarion, 1891
 Portraits de cire, Paris, Lecene, oudin, 3e éd.,1891, 446 p. Souvenirs de Maupassant
 Tout pour l'honneur, C. Lévy, Paris, 1892
 Marins et soldats, C. Lévy, Paris, 1892
 Les mondains, Calmann Levy, 1893, 331 p.
 Gladys Paris, Calmann Lévy, 5e édition, 1894, 325 p.
 Je deviens colon. mœurs algériennes, 3e édition, Calmann-levy, 1895
 Notes sur la Norvège, C. Lévy, Paris, 1895
 "Le Festéjadou" recits du sud - calmann levy editeur 1895
 Ô mon passé...Mémoires d’un enfant, Calman Lévy, 1896
 Le maître de l’heure, Calmann-levy, 1897
 Les Amants byzantins, Paris, Calmann-Lévy, 1897
 Nos filles. Qu’en ferons-nous? , Calmann Lévy, 1898.* Nos fils - Que feront-ils? 1899
 Gens de poudre, 1899
 L’attentat Sloughine, mœurs terroristes années 1890 à 1920, Paris, Ernest Flammarion, 1900
 Le Bilan du divorce, 1900
 Ménélik et nous, Paris, Librairie Nilsson, 1901,446 pp.
 Voyage au Ouallaga. Itinéraire d’Addis-Ababa au Nil bleu (avec une carte hors texte), dans le bulletin de la société de géographie, Masson, 1901
 Prisonniers marocains, l’épopée d’Afrique, Calmann-levy, 1903
 Chasses et gens d’Abyssinie, Calmann-levy , 1903
 Le Wyoming, 1904
 Ô mon passé, illustrations De J. Jamet. Paris, Ideal-Bibliothèque Pierre Lafitte Et Cie, 1910, 113 p.
 Au champ d’honneur, Plon, 1916
 Niger et Tchad, Mission Hugues Le Roux, Ministère des Affaires étrangères, 1918
 Te souviens-tu ?, Plon 1920

Theatre 
 L'Instantané, vaudeville avec Gaston Arman de Caillavet, Théâtre des Bouffes-Parisiens, octobre 1901

References

External links 

 
 

Notices d'autorité : Fichier d'autorité international virtuel • Bibliothèque nationale de France • Système universitaire de documentation • Library of congress • Gemeinsame Normdatei • Base Léonore • WorldCat
Côte d'Ivoire : mission Hugues Le Roux, 1918 disponible sur Gallica

1860 births
1925 deaths
French journalists
French male non-fiction writers
French Senators of the Third Republic